William Richardson (22 August 1866 – 3 January 1930) was an Australian cricketer. He played twelve first-class matches for New South Wales between 1887/88 and 1895/96.

See also
 List of New South Wales representative cricketers

References

External links
 

1866 births
1930 deaths
Australian cricketers
New South Wales cricketers
Cricketers from Sydney